Midland County is a county located in the U.S. state of Michigan. As of the 2020 Census, the population was 83,494. The county seat is Midland. The county's name is due to its closeness to the geographical Lower Peninsula's geographical center. It was founded in 1831.  However, it was not until 1855 that the county was effectively organized.

Midland County comprises the Midland, MI Metropolitan Statistical Area and is included in the Saginaw–Midland–Bay City Combined Statistical Area in the Mid/Central Michigan region.

History

Early history

For many centuries, Midland County was inhabited by Native Americans, and by the time of European contact it was inhabited by the Chippewa Indian Tribe.

19th century

In the year of 1831, Midland County's borders had been set. In 1850, Midland County was officially organized. In 1874, the Flint and Pere Marquette Railroad linked Midland to the nationwide railroad network. The City of Midland, the county seat, is officially incorporated in 1887, and 3 years later in 1890, Herbert Henry Dow arrives and founds the Dow Chemical Corporation, now one of the largest chemical companies in the world.

Civil War
When the American Civil War broke out in 1861, many men from the county enlisted in the Union Army, many in Company B of the 10th Michigan Volunteer Infantry Regiment, and Company H of the 27th Michigan Volunteer Infantry Regiment, but some ended up in different regiments. Not all of them came back alive and several were wounded. Many veterans of the war are also buried in the county. There were a total of 5 different Posts, or veteran groups, of the Grand Army of the Republic, a Union veterans organization, in Midland County.

Some of the regiments which included men from Midland County are: 10th Michigan Volunteer Infantry Regiment, 27th Michigan Volunteer Infantry Regiment, 29th Michigan Volunteer Infantry Regiment, 16th Michigan Volunteer Infantry Regiment, 3rd Michigan Volunteer Cavalry Regiment, 7th Michigan Volunteer Cavalry Regiment, 2nd Michigan Volunteer Cavalry Regiment, 1st Michigan Volunteer Cavalry Regiment, and 23rd Michigan Volunteer Infantry Regiment.

20th century

In the 20th Century the county saw significant growth with the entrenchment of the Dow Chemical Corporation and the establishment of major roads, highways, and a few minor airports. However, in the late 20th Century the Pere Marquette Railroad was closed, which cut off passenger train travel from the region.

World War 1
In World War 1, once the US had entered the war in 1917, the Dow Chemical Corporation, based mainly in the city of Midland, was involved with the production of poisonous gases for use during the war, and with the production of ammunition. Additionally, 675 men from Midland joined the US military during the war, and 8 of them died in the line of duty.

World War 2

In World War 2, many men from the county enlisted in the US Military, and several would die. Additionally Dow turned its factories towards supplying the war effort and they would assist in manufacturing explosives, flares, and medicine. There is also a large memorial to veterans from Midland County from this war.

Cold War
During the Cold War, an Army National Guard depot was set up in the city of Midland. In the Vietnam War, Dow and the rest of Midland County were the main suppliers of Napalm used during the conflict. Several men would also die in the Korean War and Vietnam War.

21st century
In the 21st century, the Sons of Union Veterans, the successor to the Grand Army of the Republic, founded the U.S. Grant Camp No. 67, which serves the Midland, Saginaw, and Bay City area. During the War on Terror, many men from the county enlisted and few died. The Midland County Veterans Memorial was refurbished. The city of Coleman also built a new war memorial. Curiously, none of these memorials reference the service of Midland men in the Civil War.

In May 2020, Midland County residents in parts of the city of Midland, the village of Sanford, Edenville Township, Midland Township, Tittabawassee, Thomas Township, Saginaw Township, Lincoln Township, Homer Township and Dow Chemical were forced to evacuate due to high flooding which was caused by the breach of the Edenville and Sanford dams.

Geography

Adjacent counties
Gladwin County (north)
Bay County (east)
Saginaw County (southeast)
Gratiot County (south)
Isabella County (west)
Clare County (northwest)

Transportation

Highways

Airports
Scheduled airline service is available from MBS International Airport in Freeland, Michigan and  Bishop International Airport in Flint, Michigan.  Midland also has a general aviation airport, Jack Barstow Municipal Airport.

Public transportation
There is no regularly scheduled public transportation (bus service). Residents can call in advance to schedule pickup for transport within the county by two government sponsored agencies ("Dial-A-Ride" within the city of Midland and "County Connection" for those outside the city of Midland but still within Midland County) for a nominal fee.

Demographics

As of the census of 2000, there were 82,874 people, 31,769 households, and 22,683 families residing in the county.  The population density was 159 people per square mile (61/km2).  There were 33,796 housing units at an average density of 65 per square mile (25/km2).  The racial makeup of the county was 95.50% White, 1.05% Black or African American, 0.40% Native American, 1.49% Asian, 0.03% Pacific Islander, 0.44% from other races, and 1.09% from two or more races.  1.55% of the population were Hispanic or Latino of any race. 28.6% were of German, 11.5% English, 10.2% United States or American, 8.9% Irish and 6.1% Polish ancestry, 96.7% spoke only English, while 1.6% spoke Spanish at home.

There were 31,769 households, out of which 34.90% had children under the age of 18 living with them, 60.10% were married couples living together, 8.10% had a female householder with no husband present, and 28.60% were non-families. 23.50% of all households were made up of individuals, and 9.00% had someone living alone who was 65 years of age or older.  The average household size was 2.56 and the average family size was 3.04.

In the county, the population was spread out, with 26.90% under the age of 18, 8.70% from 18 to 24, 29.20% from 25 to 44, 23.20% from 45 to 64, and 12.00% who were 65 years of age or older.  The median age was 36 years. For every 100 females there were 96.30 males.  For every 100 females age 18 and over, there were 93.30 males.

The median income for a household in the county was $45,674, and the median income for a family was $55,483. Males had a median income of $45,656 versus $27,470 for females. The per capita income for the county was $23,383.  About 5.70% of families and 8.40% of the population were below the poverty line, including 9.50% of those under age 18 and 7.50% of those age 65 or over.

Religion
The Roman Catholic Diocese of Saginaw is the controlling regional body for the Catholic Church.

Politics

Midland County has been a consistent stronghold of Republican Party, having supported its presidential candidates in every election from 1968 onward. In contrast, neighboring Saginaw County mainly supports the Democratic Party.

Government
The county government operates the jail, maintains rural roads, operates the
major local courts, keeps files of deeds and mortgages, maintains vital records, administers
public health regulations, and participates with the state in the provision of welfare and
other social services. The county board of commissioners controls the
budget but has only limited authority to make laws or ordinances.  In Michigan, most local
government functions — police and fire, building and zoning, tax assessment, street
maintenance, etc. — are the responsibility of individual cities and townships. Due to funding cuts, the Midland County Sheriff does not have a patrol division. Former patrol officers now serve in the Citizens Assistance Responders (CAR) division and will respond to requests for assistance.

Elected officials
 Prosecuting Attorney: J. Dee Brooks
 Sheriff: Myron Greene
 County Clerk: Ann Manary
 County Treasurer: Cathy Lunsford
 Register of Deeds: Julie Atkinson
 Drain Commissioner: Douglas D. Enos

Board of Commissioners
7 members, elected from districts (7 Republicans)

Communities

Cities
Coleman
Midland (county seat)

Village
Sanford

Charter townships
Larkin Charter Township
Midland Charter Township

Civil townships

Edenville Township
Geneva Township
Greendale Township
Homer Township
Hope Township
Ingersoll Township
Jasper Township
Jerome Township
Lee Township
Lincoln Township
Mills Township
Mount Haley Township
Porter Township
Warren Township

See also
 List of Michigan State Historic Sites in Midland County, Michigan
National Register of Historic Places listings in Midland County, Michigan

References

External links
Midland County web site
Midland County Historical Society
Midland County's Historic Bridges
MidlandOnline

Midland Tomorrow web site

 
Michigan counties
1855 establishments in Michigan
Populated places established in 1855